Iversenfjellet is the highest mountain of Hopen in the Svalbard archipelago. It has a height of 371 m.a.s.l. and is located at the southern portion of Hopen. The mountain is named after fisheries consultant Thor Iversen.

See also
Kapp Thor – the southernmost point of Hopen, was also named after Thor Iversen.

References

Mountains of Svalbard
Hopen (Svalbard)